WHIZ-TV (channel 18) is a television station in Zanesville, Ohio, United States, affiliated with NBC, Fox and MyNetworkTV. It is owned by Marquee Broadcasting alongside the company's only radio properties—WHIZ (1240 AM), WHIZ-FM (92.7), and WZVL (103.7 FM). The stations share studios on Downard Road in Zanesville, where WHIZ-TV's transmitter is also located.

Although this station is somewhat overshadowed by network affiliates in the nearby Columbus market such as fellow NBC affiliate WCMH-TV, WHIZ-TV provides local news to its limited local area. In addition, the station provides local sports programming, including local high school basketball games on Fridays. It is the only major commercial television station in Zanesville, with the only other local station being PBS member station WOUC-TV (Ohio University at Athens).

History

Construction on WHIZ-TV began in 1952 at the Downard Road site for Zanesville's first television station. On May 23, 1953, WHIZ-TV began broadcasting on channel 50, with just enough power to reach the 500 or so television sets in the Zanesville area. A year and a half later, WHIZ-TV moved to channel 18, and increased its power output to 186 kW in addition to operating broadcast translators on channel 71 (W71AB) in Coshocton and channel 80 (W80AA) in Cambridge. In 1986, channel 18 increased power output to 589 kW with a new antenna, and introduced stereo sound.

WHIZ-TV has been a primary NBC affiliate since the station began, but until 1966 cherry-picked programming from CBS and ABC as well. It also aired some DuMont programming in the 1950s. As WHIZ is the only commercial station in the market, Charter Spectrum's Zanesville system supplements the area with the Columbus stations.

In 2002, WHIZ-TV began broadcasting in digital on channel 40.

On July 25, 2008, WHIZ was knocked off the air when its power combiner failed. While the station was able to restore its digital signal, it was determined that there was no way to restore the analog signal until early 2009. The originally scheduled digital transition date of February 17 meant that the analog transmitter would be repaired, only to be used for around 48 more days, at most. WHIZ decided not to repair it, as it was financially pointless to restore analog service, and became digital-only as of that date.

On April 20, 2022, it was announced that Salisbury, Maryland–based Marquee Broadcasting would acquire WHIZ-TV and its sister radio stations for $10.7 million; the sale was completed on July 15.

On October 24, 2022, the station announced that its second subchannel would affiliate with Fox on November 14, replacing WSYX-DT3 from Columbus on local cable and satellite systems, six days before the start of the 2022 FIFA World Cup. The subchannel brands itself as Fox 5, in reference to its Spectrum cable position. The subchannel also carries MyNetworkTV programming as part of its weeknight late night schedule, duplicating the prime time scheduling of WSYX-DT2 (which otherwise carries This TV as a primary affiliation and remains on market cable systems).

WSYX's main ABC channel continues to be carried on area cable systems, along with CBS affiliates WBNS-TV from Columbus and WIYE-LD from Parkersburg, West Virginia.

Subchannels
The station's digital signal is multiplexed:

Availability
WHIZ is seen on cable systems in several adjacent counties, including Coshocton, Guernsey, Hocking, Licking, Morgan and Perry. It is shown on cable as far south as Nelsonville and used to be on cable systems as far west as Lancaster, Ohio, but has not been carried on cable any farther west than Perry County, the Buckeye Lake region and Granville in several years.

Other stations

Marquee Broadcasting also owns and operates radio stations WHIZ AM, WHIZ-FM ("Z-92"), and WZVL ("Highway 103"). The WHIZ Media Group operated WCVZ ("Highway 102") prior to its replacement by what is now WWLG ("La Grande 102.5"); it continues to hold WWLG's license, even though that station moved from Zanesville to the Columbus market in 2009 and is operated by Urban One through a local marketing agreement.

Until early 2008, WHIZ also operated CW Plus stations in Zanesville (WBZV) and Parkersburg, West Virginia (WBPB). After their closure, it was replaced on cable lineups by WWHO in Zanesville and WQCW in Parkersburg. The CW Plus has since been reinstated on Zanesville cable lineups, now operated directly by the various cable providers serving the market.

References

External links

Zanesville, Ohio
HIZ-TV
NBC network affiliates
Fox network affiliates
MyNetworkTV affiliates
Cozi TV affiliates
Television channels and stations established in 1953
1953 establishments in Ohio
Marquee Broadcasting